Coleophora leucobela is a moth of the family Coleophoridae. It is found in Madagascar.

References

leucobela
Moths described in 1934
Moths of Madagascar